Nada Kotlušek (born 9 August 1934) is a Slovenian athlete. She competed in the women's shot put at the 1952 Summer Olympics and the 1956 Summer Olympics, representing Yugoslavia.

References

1934 births
Living people
Athletes (track and field) at the 1952 Summer Olympics
Athletes (track and field) at the 1956 Summer Olympics
Slovenian female shot putters
Slovenian female discus throwers
Olympic athletes of Yugoslavia
Place of birth missing (living people)